The Musée de l'air et de l'espace (English: Air and Space Museum), is a French aerospace museum, located at the south-eastern edge of Paris–Le Bourget Airport, north of Paris, and in the commune of Le Bourget. It was inaugurated in 1919 after a proposal by the celebrated aeronautics engineer Albert Caquot (1881–1976).

Description 

The museum's collection contains more than 19,595 items, including 150 aircraft, and material from as far back as the 16th Century. Also displayed are more modern air and spacecraft, including the prototype for Concorde, and Swiss and Soviet rockets. The museum also has the only known remaining piece — the jettisoned main landing gear — of L'Oiseau Blanc (The White Bird), the 1927 aircraft which attempted to make the first Transatlantic crossing from Paris to New York. On May 8, 1927, Charles Nungesser and François Coli aboard L'Oiseau blanc, a 450-hp Lorraine-powered Levasseur biplane  took off from Le Bourget. The aircraft jettisoned its main landing gear (which is stored at the museum), which it was designed to do as part of its trans-Atlantic flight profile, but then disappeared over the Atlantic, only two weeks before Lindbergh's monoplane completed its successful solo non-stop trans-Atlantic flight to Le Bourget from the United States.

Other items of interest range include:

gilded bronze medallion of the Montgolfier brothers, created in 1783 by Jean-Antoine Houdon (1741–1828)
the Biot-Massia glider (1879)
an 1884 electric motor by Arthur Constantin Krebs (1850–1935)
the rear gondola of the 1915 Zeppelin LZ 113, equipped with 3 Maybach type HS engines
a 1916 SPAD VII aircraft by Blériot-SPAD and flown by French flying ace Georges Guynemer in World War I
a 1917 Airco DH.9 aircraft by Geoffrey de Havilland (1882–1965)
a 1918 Junkers D.I aircraft by Hugo Junkers (1859–1935)
a 1961 Dassault Mirage IIIC by Marcel Dassault (1892–1986)
an SSBS S3 surface-to-surface ballistic missile commissioned in 1981
a 2002 Dassault-Breguet Super Étendard model.

Aircraft on display

Grand Gallery 

Antoinette VII
Blériot XI
Voisin-Farman No 1
Santos-Dumont Demoiselle

Between the Wars and Light Aviation Hall 
Bréguet 14
Farman Goliath
Oiseau Blanc

Nieuport 11

World War II Hall 

Bücker Bü 181
Dewoitine D.520
Douglas A-1 Skyraider
Douglas C-47 Skytrain
Douglas DC-3 cockpit
Focke-Wulf Fw 190
North American P-51 Mustang
Republic P-47 Thunderbolt
Supermarine Spitfire Mk XVI
V-1 flying bomb

Roundel Hall 

Dassault Mirage III
Dassault Mystère IV
Dassault Ouragan
North American F-86D Sabre
North American F-100 Super Sabre
Republic F-84 Thunderjet

Prototype Hall 

Aérospatiale Ludion
Dassault Balzac V
Leduc 0.10
Nord 1500 Griffon
SNCASO Trident
Sud-Ouest SO.6000 Triton

Concorde Hall 

Concorde (two, F-WTSS prototype and Air France F-BTSD) 
Concorde 001 is featured in its 1973 Solar Eclipse mission livery, with the special rooftop portholes visible.
Dassault Mirage IV. The plane number 9 (F-THAH) was used to drop a live nuclear bomb during the Tamouré nuclear test in 1966.
Dassault Mirage 4000
Eurocopter X3
Sud Aviation Caravelle forward fuselage

Tarmac/Exterior Exhibit 

Boeing 747
Ariane 1 (model)
Ariane 5 (model)
Airbus A380
Douglas DC-8
Canadair CL-215
Lockheed P-2 Neptune
Breguet Atlantic
Dassault Mercure
Transall C-160
Dassault Super Etendard
SEPECAT Jaguar
Dassault Mirage 4000
Dassault Rafale A

See also 

 List of aerospace museums
 List of museums in Paris

References

External links 

  
 Official website in English, currently not fully translated

Museums in Seine-Saint-Denis
Aerospace museums in France
National museums of France
Museums established in 1919
1919 establishments in France
Air force museums